The Stung Battambang 1 (or Battambang 1) is a dam planned for construction on the Battambang River in Cambodia. The river is a major tributary of the Tonlé Sap. Of the two dams planned for this river, the larger is the Stung Battambang 1. A letter of commitment has been issued by the Cambodian authorities for a pre-feasibility study of the dam by an unknown Korean company

There is little data available about reservoir size or number of people who will be displaced. The dam is one of three possible dams in the Battambang River basin; the other two would block two tributaries to the Battambang River: the Mongkol Borey River and the Sangker River.

See also

 Mekong
 Mekong River Commission
 Battambang River

References

External links

Mekong Environment and Resource Institute
Mekong Program on Water, Environment and Resilience
Mekong River Commission

Dams in the Mekong River Basin
Proposed hydroelectric power stations
Hydroelectric power stations in Cambodia
Dams in Cambodia
Battambang province
Proposed renewable energy power stations in Cambodia